Albert Edward Humpish (3 March 1902 – 26 September 1986) was an English footballer who played in The Football League for Halifax Town, Bury, Wigan Borough, Arsenal, Bristol City, Stockport County and Rochdale. He also appeared for Wigan Athletic in the Cheshire League, appearing in 35 league games and scoring ten goals.

References

1902 births
1986 deaths
English footballers
Association football wing halves
Halifax Town A.F.C. players
English Football League players
Bury F.C. players
Wigan Borough F.C. players
Arsenal F.C. players
Bristol City F.C. players
Stockport County F.C. players
Rochdale A.F.C. players
Wigan Athletic F.C. players